The Beijing BJ60 is a full-size SUV produced by BAIC Motor under the Beijing off-road brand and debuted on the 2022 Beijing Auto Show.

Overview

The Beijing BJ60 is the largest off-road vehicle ever developed by Beijing off-road and is available as a five-seater and seven-seater vehicle. Construction is a body-on-frame chassis underpinned with independent suspension with three locking differentials with an All-Terrain four-wheel-drive control system offered.

Powertrain
Two 2.0-liter turbocharged four-cylinder petrol engines are listed with the 48-volt mild-hybrid technology and all powertrains are mated to an eight-speed automatic transmission. A 2.0-liter turbo-diesel engine with 48-volt mild-hybrid tech will also be available.

References

External links

Sport utility vehicles
Off-road vehicles
BJ60
Cars introduced in 2022
2020s cars
Full-size sport utility vehicles
All-wheel-drive vehicles